A. V. Subramanian is an Indian politician who served as Speaker of 10th Puducherry Legislative Assembly and Deputy Speaker of 9th and 11th Puducherry Legislative Assembly and currently serving as President of Puducherry Pradesh Congress Committee.

Personal life 
In August 2020, he tested positive for SARS-CoV-2.

References 

Indian National Congress politicians from Puducherry
Speakers of Puducherry Legislative Assembly
Deputy Speakers of Puducherry Legislative Assembly
Members of the Puducherry Legislative Assembly
Year of birth missing (living people)
Living people